State Highway 69 (SH 69) is a New Zealand state highway servicing the southeastern areas of the Buller District in the South Island of New Zealand. The road is 33 kilometres long and runs parallel with both the Stillwater-Westport Line and the Inangahua River. The road connects the towns of Reefton (on SH 7) with the town of Inangahua Junction (on SH 6) via Cronadun. The highway is part of the main link between the centres of Christchurch and Westport.

See also
 List of New Zealand state highways

External links
New Zealand Transport Agency

69